Laos first competed at the Asian Games in 1974.

Asian Games

Medals By Summer Games

Medals by Summer Sport

Medals by sport

Asian Indoor and Martial Arts Games

Medals by Games

Asian Beach Games

Medals by Games

Asian Youth Games

Medals by Games

Asian Para Games

Medals by Games

Asian Youth Para Games

Medals by Games

Other Appearances

ASEAN School Games

Medals by Games

ASEAN Para Games

*Red border color indicates tournament was held on home soil.

Medals by Games

Afro-Asian Games

Medals by Games

FESPIC Games

Medals by Games

FESPIC Youth Games

Medals by Games

See also
 Laos at the Olympics
 Laos at the Paralympics
 Laos at the Southeast Asian Games

References